Wilson Swain Caldwell (1841-1898) was a distinguished Civil War-era African American.  Born into slavery on February 27, 1841, his mother was Rosa Burgess, a slave of the University of North Carolina President David Swain. His father was November 'Doctor' Caldwell, a slave of Joseph Caldwell. Children born to slave mothers were the property of the mother's master, so that Wilson Caldwell was owned by Swain at birth, and was named Wilson Swain until Emancipation, at which point he took his father's last name.

Wilson Caldwell grew up alongside the son of David Swain, Richard Caswell Swain (1836-1872), whereby Caldwell received some education—a rare opportunity for slaves at that time. 

Wilson Caldwell was for many years head janitor at the University. He was a key member of a delegation that persuaded Union armies to spare the University during the Civil War, a time when many Southern cities were being burned to the ground.  Fleeing the approach of Union troops, a small detachment of Confederate cavalry entered Chapel Hill on April 14, 1865. They intended to protect the University but continued to retreat after a two-day pause. Lacking further defenses, Chapel Hill citizens resolved to save the town by surrendering peacefully. Wilson Caldwell walked out with University President Swain, Judge W. H. Battle and others to the "foot of Piney Prospect to meet the incoming detachment of [General Hugh Judson Kilpatrick's] cavalry, in order to claim protection for the town and the University." The presence of a leader from Chapel Hill's Black community was an important factor, and their request for protection "was promptly granted" (Battle, 1895).

After the Civil War Caldwell took advantage of the new freedoms afforded to former slaves. He returned to work at the University in 1884 and remained head of the campus workforce until his death.

Wilson Caldwell was married to Susan Kirby. They had twelve children, of whom five died in childhood from pneumonia, and two others predeceased their parents.  Caldwell died in 1898 and is buried at the Old Chapel Hill Cemetery, beside his father, November Caldwell, and his son, Doctor Edwin Caldwell.  The UNC class of 1891 had a monument placed on his grave, a large sandstone obelisk once used to honor University president Joseph Caldwell.

External links
 Wilson Caldwell at the Old Chapel Hill Cemetery
 Wilson Caldwell at the UNC Virtual Museum

References 

 Battle KP. (1895). Wilson Caldwell, North Carolina University Magazine, v. 14, 1894-1895, p. 315-318. <http://www.lib.unc.edu/mss/exhibits/slavery/documents/caldwellsketch_1.html>
 Peele WJ. (1898). A Pen-Picture of Wilson Caldwell, colored, late janitor of the University of North Carolina, North Carolina Collection, University of North Carolina Library Call Number: CpB_C145p. <http://www.lib.unc.edu/mss/exhibits/slavery/documents/penpicture_1.html>

1841 births
1898 deaths
University of North Carolina at Chapel Hill people